The Campeonato Nacional III Divisão de Futebol Feminino is the third-highest division of the Portuguese women's football league system. It is run by the Portuguese Football Federation and began in 2008. The current champions are Braga B, who won their first title in 2022.

Competition 
After some years of supporting women football, many teams were formed and supported by FPF. In order to have a more competitive level before the first division, the number of teams of the second division was reduced and the third division was formed. The inaugural season was in 2021-22.

List of champions

References

External links
 
 

Por
Sports leagues established in 2008
2008 establishments in Portugal
2
Recurring sporting events established in 2008
Women
Women's sports leagues in Portugal
Professional sports leagues in Portugal